Tasnim News Agency is a semi-official news agency in Iran. It has links to the Islamic Revolutionary Guard Corps (IRGC). Launched in 2012, its purpose is to cover a variety of political, social, economic and international subjects along with other fields. All its content is licensed as Creative Commons.

Profile
Its stated aims are to "[defend] the Islamic Republic against negative media propaganda campaign and providing our readers with realities on the ground about Iran and Islam."

As of 2014, Tasnim's main headquarters for news is based in Iran's capital Tehran, with reporters across the country and region sending in reports.

Tasnim has strong links with the Islamic Revolutionary Guard Corps (IRGC). On 10 April 2013 the IRGC chief Mohammad Ali Jafari visited the Tasnim headquarters and was quoted by the news agency saying "The faithful and Revolutionary media have today a very heavy duty in confronting anti-islamic and anti-human plots of the oppressors".

News fields 
All news topics of Tasnim News are in the fields such as the Islamic Awakening, political, cultural, social, economic, international, sports, pictures, graphics, movies, audio and other fields.

Tasnim English News
Tasnim News Agency maintains a department staffed with dual language speakers of both English and Persian which translates some of the agency's articles into English.

Tasnim Hebrew News
Tasnim Hebrew News officially started publishing news on 3 January 2022.

COVID-19 pandemic
According to a report from the Anti-Defamation League, Tasnim has alleged in a series of articles that COVID-19 is part of 
"an American and Jewish plot at world domination through population control" hatched by Henry Kissinger, who is described as "the unique Jewish scholar and American strategist" and "a master controller of government and international finance."

References

External links

 

2012 establishments in Iran
Government agencies established in 2012
News agencies based in Iran
Multilingual news services
Mass media in Tehran
Creative Commons-licensed websites
Politics of Iran
Islamic Revolutionary Guard Corps